Nick Barraclough (born 1951) is a British radio producer, presenter, musician and writer, who is best known for hosting shows related to specialist American music. He had presented the long-running Nick Barraclough's New Country show for BBC Radio 2 between 1992 and 2007, and Smooth Country for the Smooth Radio network from 2007 to 2008. Between 2006 and 2013 he made a number of music-related documentaries for BBC Radio 4.

Early career 
For a number of years in the 1970s-early 1980s he worked as a musician in groups that included "Baby Whale", worked as one of the backing musicians for bluegrass artist Pete Sayers, and led the folk/country/swing acoustic group "Telephone Bill and the Smooth Operators", later revived in the 2000s. His career in radio began in 1982, with the launch of BBC Radio Cambridgeshire.  There he hosted the breakfast show and was later a mid morning presenter.

In 1986, he moved to Manchester to produce programmes and sessions for Radios 1 and 2. While in Manchester he also wrote and produced the first definitive radio documentary series about Country  music.  The series was called Hit It Boys, and was presented by Ricky Skaggs.

After a year in Manchester, he moved to London, where he produced further documentaries, Radio 2's Gloria Hunniford, and Wally Whyton's Country Club.

Nick Barraclough's New Country 
With an upsurge of interest in the Country genre in the early 1990s, BBC Radio 2 was keen to put together a new show which would reflect the changes in the music, and its growing popularity.  Nick's name was put forward.  Consequently, Nick Barraclough's New Country was commissioned in 1992.  An initial run of three months was planned, but the show quickly gained an audience, so became a regular feature of Radio 2's weekly schedule.  It ran on a weekly basis until April 2007, when Barraclough left Radio 2 and joined the then newly launched Smooth Radio, where he presented the country music programme on Sunday evenings. However, he left Smooth Radio in June 2008 due to other work commitments. Since then he has produced three major series for the Guardian Media Group; on the music of the Mississippi, New York's Brill Building and the West Coast music scene between 1960 and 2000, as well as several projects for Radio 4 and Radio 2

Other
In 2001, he was awarded the Country Music Association's International Country Broadcaster Award for his work on promoting country music in the UK.

In 2010 he was nominated for Best Music Entertainment Producer, in the Radio Production Awards, for R.E.S.P.E.C.T., the Art of Backing Vocals.

Barraclough together with John Leonard founded in 1995 the radio production company, Smooth Operations, which produced his long running show, as well as that of Radio 2 colleague Mike Harding and other programmes for the Radio 2 network. Smooth Operations is now part of the 7Digital music group.

Barraclough lives in Cambridge, with wife Judy.  His musical ventures continue with the Della Portas, Nick Barraclough & the Pillars of Creation, The Dead Cowboys, CBT, The Corellis and The Brokedown Palace. He has written a novel based on the life of the artist Wesley West, and is currently writing a novel set in a 1980s local radio station.

References

External links 

A biography

1951 births
Living people
People from Cambridge
British radio DJs
British radio personalities
Musicians from Cambridgeshire